Haryana Pradesh Congress Committee (or Haryana PCC) is the unit of the Indian National Congress, working in the state of Haryana. Its head office is situated at Chandigarh.
Senior leader and four times MLA Mr Udai Bhan is the present chief of the Haryana Pradesh Congress Committee.

Haryana Pradesh Legislative Assembly election

Chief Ministers of Haryana State
 B. D. Sharma,1 November 1966 to 23 March 1967
 Bansi Lal, 22 May 1968 to 30 November 1975, 5 July 1985 to 19 June 1987,11 May 1996 to 23 July 1999.
 Banarsi Das Gupta,1 December 1975 to 30 April 1977.
 Bhajan Lal, 22 January 1980 to 5 July 1985, 23 July 1991 to 9 May 1996
 Bhupinder Singh Hooda, 5 March 2005 to 19 October 2014

See also
 Indian National Congress
 Congress Working Committee
 All India Congress Committee
 Pradesh Congress Committee

References

External links
 

Indian National Congress of Haryana